Zachary Mills  (born December 26, 1995) is an American former actor. He is known for his roles in the films, Hollywoodland (2006), Mr. Magorium's Wonder Emporium (2007), Kit Kittredge: An American Girl (2008), and Super 8 (2011).

Personal life
Zach was born in Lakewood, Ohio, to Kerry and Patrick. His father is from Cleveland, and his mother is from New York, which is where Zach performed his first professional acting job at the age of 8. Zach has two older half-brothers who do not act.

Career
Mills has appeared in multiple film and television productions. These include a brief appearance in the television series Scrubs and guest starring roles in such shows as Malcolm in the Middle, Eleventh Hour, Numb3rs, Ghost Whisperer and October Road. His first significant supporting role in a film was as Adrien Brody's son in the 2006 film, Hollywoodland. In 2007 he appeared in the Hallmark movie The Valley of Light, and that year would also mark his leading role in Mr. Magorium's Wonder Emporium, in which he acted alongside Dustin Hoffman and Natalie Portman. In 2008 he appeared in a leading role in the film Kit Kittredge: An American Girl, and a supporting role as a news vendor in the Clint Eastwood-directed Changeling. In 2011, Zach played "Preston" in J. J. Abrams's Super 8 , as well as "Lucas Morganstern" in the Hub miniseries Clue.

Filmography

Television

Awards
 2008 Young Artist Award
 Best Performance in a Feature Film – Leading Young Actor for Mr. Magorium's Wonder Emporium — Nominated
 Best Performance in a TV Movie, Miniseries or Special – Supporting Young Actor for The Valley of Light — Nominated
 2009 Young Artist Award
 Best Performance in a Feature Film – Supporting Young Actor for Kit Kittredge: An American Girl — Nominated
 Best Performance in a Feature Film – Young Ensemble Cast for Kit Kittredge: An American Girl — Won
 2012 Young Artist Award
 Best Performance in a Feature Film - Supporting Young Actor for Super 8 - Nominated

References

External links

Male actors from Ohio
American male child actors
American male film actors
American male television actors
Living people
People from Lakewood, Ohio
21st-century American male actors
1995 births